Acrobasis exsulella, the cordovan pyralid moth, is a species of snout moth in the genus Acrobasis. It was described by Philipp Christoph Zeller in 1848, and is known from the southeastern United States.

References

Moths described in 1848
Acrobasis
Moths of North America